Evergestis holophaealis is a moth in the family Crambidae. It was described by George Hampson in 1913. It is found in China and Japan.

References

Evergestis
Moths described in 1913
Moths of Asia
Moths of Japan